Philippe Aubertin (born 23 April 1969 in Nancy) is a French sprint canoeist who competed from the early 1990s to the early 2000s. Competing in two Summer Olympics, he earned his best finish of fourth in the K-2 500 m event at Sydney in 2000.

References
 Sports-Reference.com profile

1966 births
Canoeists at the 1992 Summer Olympics
Canoeists at the 2000 Summer Olympics
French male canoeists
Living people
Olympic canoeists of France
Sportspeople from Nancy, France
20th-century French people